Oskar Nerlinger (23 March 1893 – 25 August 1969) was a German painter. His work was part of the painting event in the art competition at the 1932 Summer Olympics.

References

1893 births
1969 deaths
20th-century German painters
20th-century German male artists
German male painters
Olympic competitors in art competitions
People from Enzkreis